William Milo Olin (September 18, 1845 – April 15, 1911) was an American journalist and  politician who served as the Massachusetts Secretary of the Commonwealth.  Olin was born in Warrenton, Georgia to parents from Massachusetts, and in 1850 his family moved back to Massachusetts, where he attended school in Worcester and Grafton.  Enlisting in the 36th Massachusetts Volunteer Infantry in 1862 during the American Civil War, he eventually rose through the ranks to lieutenant colonel, assistant adjutant general, and Adjutant General.  After the American Civil Was Olin went to work for The Boston Advertiser.  In the fourteen years Olin worked for the Advertiser he was, in succession, a reporter, editor and Washington, D.C. correspondent of that newspaper.  He was later a private secretary to Massachusetts Governors Thomas Talbot and John Davis Long and U.S. Senator Henry L. Dawes.  A Republican, he served as Massachusetts Secretary of the Commonwealth from 1892 until he died in Boston on April 15, 1911.  At the time of his death, he was chief of staff of the National Grand Army of the Republic.

References

  

1845 births
1911 deaths
Secretaries of the Commonwealth of Massachusetts
Politicians from Boston
People from Warrenton, Georgia
Massachusetts Republicans
Boston Daily Advertiser people
19th-century American politicians
Grand Army of the Republic officials